St. Bridget of Ireland Parish is a Roman Catholic congregation in Stamford, Connecticut, part of the Diocese of Bridgeport.

History 
The parish was established on September 7, 1963 by the Right Reverend Walter W. Curtis, Bishop of Bridgeport. Worship first occurred in the neighboring chapel and school. The parish supported the parochial school of St. Bridget School until its closure in 1979.

Building
The modernist brick church was begun in 1963 and completed in 1965. Dedication of St. Bridget's Chapel-Auditorium-School occurred on June 25, 1965.  The congregation continued to worship in the Chapel-Auditorium until Bishop Curtis dedicated the newly renovated church on June 14, 1987. The hall was renovated and a kitchen erected in the 2000s. The “Our Lady of Strawberry Hill Shrine” was dedicated in 2003. The shrine to Padre Pio was added in 2004.

List of pastors
1963–1967: The Reverend Thomas P. Guinan 
1967–1972: The Reverend William A. Nagel 
1972–1997: The Reverend John Jazowski 
1997–2009 The Reverend Gill C. Babeu 
2009-2022 The Reverend Edward J. McAuley 
2022-present The Reverend James K. Bates

References

External links 
 St. Bridget of Ireland – Website
 Diocese of Bridgeport

Roman Catholic churches in Stamford, Connecticut
Modernist architecture in Connecticut
Roman Catholic churches completed in 1965
Roman Catholic churches completed in 1987
Christian organizations established in 1963
Roman Catholic Diocese of Bridgeport
20th-century Roman Catholic church buildings in the United States